Dyakonovo is a rural locality (a village) in Borisoglebskoye Rural Settlement, Muromsky District, Vladimir Oblast, Russia. The population was 14 as of 2010.

Geography 
Dyakonovo is located on the Morozimo River, 31 km northwest of Murom (the district's administrative centre) by road. Savanchakovo is the nearest rural locality.

References 

Rural localities in Muromsky District
Muromsky Uyezd